Sonja Smolec (born 1953) is a Croatian artist, writer, and poet.

Biography

Smolec was born in Pula, Croatia. From 1956 to 1985, she lived in Zagreb, and currently resides in Velika Gorica.

Smolec was, at one time, a member of the art group '69', but eventually neglected her interest in painting due to family commitments.

Since February 2004, Smolec became a member of the Society of Writers for children and youth, Croatia.  She is also member of DHK Društvo hrvatskih književnika.

Works - Books for children and youth 

    Tajna ima krila - collection of stories, 2002 - Publisher: Szabo A3 Data,  
    Kamen Tvrtko - collection of stories - e-book, 2006 - Naklada Spark, Velika Gorica, Hrvatska, 
 Kamen Tvrtko - collection of stories, 2008 - Lulu, USA, 
 Kineski zvončići - novel for children, 2008 - Publisher: Albatros, Velika Gorica, Croatia, 
 The Girl with Pink Glasses - novel for children written in English, Publisher AG Press, USA 2010, 
 Halo, Zemlja zove Snježanu! - novel for children and youth, 2010 - Publisher: Alfa, Zagreb, Croatia)
 Der Stein Hartwig (German) - collection of stories, 2013, Publisher R. G. Fischer Verlag, Frankfurt am Main, Germany, 
 The Girl with Pink Glasses - novel for children written in Croatian, 2013 - Publisher: Kalliopa, Našice, Croatia, 
 Moja sestra Sarah (My sister Sarah) - novel for youth, 2015. - Publisher: Croatian Association of Writers for Children and Youth, First Writers Club, Biblioteka Velika, Zagreb, Hrvatska, 
 Moja polovica Mjeseca - novel for youth, 2017. Naklada Bošković, Split, 
 Prva klupa do prozora - novel for youth, 2017. Naklada Bošković, Split, 
 Marama s bubamarama - novel for youth and children 2017. Naklada Semafora, Biblioteka Zelena, Zagreb, ilustracije Sanja Pribić, 
 Da ti nije palo na pamet!- novel for youth, 2018. Naklada Bošković, Split, 
 Malena i Klepetan,- picture book, 2018. Izdanja Antibarbarus, Zagreb, 
 Zefir, - novel for youth, 2019. Naklada Bošković, Split, 
 Predskazivač, - novel for youth, 2019. Book one, Naklada T.I.M. Rijeka 
 Predskazivač, - novel for youth, 2020. Book two, Naklada T.I.M. Rijeka 
 Priče iz sobe na kraju hodnika, novel for youth, 2021. Naklada T.I.M. Rijeka

Books for adults

 Ada - novela, 2018. Naklada Bošković, Split,

Awards 

Smolec has won the first prize for short stories in English, an international competition run by the highly prestigious El Museo de la Palabra, Spain. As part of the ceremonies, the winners have met Princess Letizia, the future Spanish Queen. * Letizia, Princess of Asturias. 
19 June 2014 – present: Her Majesty The Queen

Awarded story: "Night Howl" * 

Official site of his majesty, Don Juan Carlos, King of Spain * 

Museo de la Palabra, Quero, Toledo, Spain * 

In the Webstilus Association competition, she won the award for the most beautiful poetry collection for 2014 - "Roots". The Webstilus Association has published her an award-winning collection.

On 7 June 2018, Smolec has won the first prize named after the Croatian writer "Mato Lovrak" for the best novel written for children and youth "Marama s Bubamarama", published by "Semafora", Zagreb, Croatia.

References

External links 
 
 Personal site of His Majesty, King of Spain
Museo da la Palabras

1953 births
Living people
Croatian artists
Croatian contemporary artists
People from Pula